Mordellistena pustulata is a species of beetle in the genus Mordellistena of the family Mordellidae. It was described by Melsheimer in 1846.

References

Beetles described in 1846
pustulata